Woo Lok Ki is a footballer who plays as a defender for Hong Kong Women League club Shatin SA. Born in Mainland China, she represents Hong Kong internationally.

International career
Woo Lok Ki represented Hong Kong at the 2013 AFC U-16 Women's Championship qualification, two AFC U-19 Women's Championship qualifications (2015 and 2017), the 2019 EAFF E-1 Football Championship and the 2020 AFC Women's Olympic Qualifying Tournament.

See also
List of Hong Kong women's international footballers

References

1990s births
Living people
Hong Kong women's footballers
Women's association football defenders
Hong Kong women's international footballers